"A Monster Like Me" is a song written by performed by Norwegian singer Kjetil Mørland and Norwegian-Swiss singer Debrah Scarlett, written by the former. The song represented Norway in the Eurovision Song Contest 2015. It was released as a digital download in Norway on 17 February 2015, later it was included on Mørland's first studio album Make a Sail (2016). The song also won the Marcel Bezençon Composer Award in 2015.

Melodi Grand Prix 2015
During the Melodi Grand Prix 2015 press conference on 21 January 2015, "A Monster Like Me" was announced as one of the eleven songs competing to represent Norway in the Eurovision Song Contest 2015 in Vienna, Austria. The song was performed ninth in the running order and was one of the four songs that continued to the Gold Final. "A Monster Like Me" received 88,869 votes overall, only 3,496 votes ahead of the runner-up, and won the opportunity to compete in Vienna.

After winning Melodi Grand Prix, the song peaked at number 24 on the VG-lista chart.

Music video
A music video to accompany the release of "A Monster Like Me" was first released onto YouTube on 20 February 2015 at a total length of three minutes and thirteen seconds. It shows the two singers preparing to have guests over for dinner as Scarlett pours a vial of red liquid into the water goblets during the climax of the song the guests at the table begin to behave  strangely as Morland and Scarlett sit oblivious to all the chaos.

Charts

Certifications

Release history

References

2015 singles
2015 songs
Eurovision songs of 2015
Eurovision songs of Norway
Melodi Grand Prix songs
Songs written by Kjetil Mørland